Zhuzhou railway station is a railway station in Lusong District, Zhuzhou, Hunan, China. It is located at the intersection of the Beijing–Guangzhou railway and the Shanghai–Kunming railway, and is also an intermediate stop on the Changsha–Zhuzhou–Xiangtan intercity railway.

The station was closed from 20 October 2021 until 30 June 2022 to allow expansion works to take place.

References 

Railway stations in Hunan